Buddleja albiflora is a deciduous shrub native to the mountains of central China, where it grows on shrub-clad slopes at altitudes of between 1,000 and 2,000 m. Named rather carelessly by Hemsley, the species was discovered by Henry, and introduced to western cultivation by Wilson in 1900.

Description

Buddleja albiflora grows to a height of 4 m  in the wild, the branches erect and glabrous. The leaves are narrow lanceolate, with a long-tapered point and wedge-shaped base, 10–22 cm long by 1–6 cm wide, toothed and dark-green, glabrous above in maturity, but covered beneath with a fine silvery-grey felt. The shrub is similar to B. davidii, but has rounded stems, as opposed to the four-angled of the latter. Despite its specific name, the fragrant flowers are actually pale lilac with orange centres, borne as slender panicles 20–45 cm long by 5 cm wide at the base; they are considered inferior to those of B. davidii and thus the plant is comparatively rare in cultivation. B. albiflora is hexaploid: 2n = 114.

Cultivation
The shrub is fully hardy in the UK, and features in the NCCPG National Collection of Buddleja held by the Longstock Park Nursery, near Stockbridge.
Hardiness: USDA zones 6–9.

References

Hillier & Sons. (1977). Hilliers' Manual of Trees and Shrubs, 4th Edition. David & Charles, Newton Abbot, England. .
 Li, P. T. & Leeuwenberg, A. J. M. (1996). Loganiaceae, in Wu, Z. & Raven, P. (eds) Flora of China, Vol. 15. Science Press, Beijing, and Missouri Botanical Garden Press, St. Louis, USA.  online at www.efloras.org

albiflora
Flora of China